Robert Wensell "Wense" Grabarek (May 21, 1919 – December 15, 2019) served as mayor of Durham, North Carolina from 1963 to 1971. Greeted upon entering office with mass civil rights demonstrations, Grabarek was credited with striking a tone of moderation. He established the "Durham Interim Committee," composed of two black and nine white members, with a mandate to “resolve and reconcile” racial differences. Over the next few months, segregation ended at most of Durham's restaurants, hotels and movie theaters, swimming pools, libraries, the chamber of commerce, and the Jaycees. Grabarek also served on the Durham City Council from 1957 to 1961.

Grabarek was born in Luzerne, Pennsylvania. He served in the United States Army during World War II. He graduated from Benjamin Franklin University and worked as an accountant. Grabarek, his wife, and family moved to Durham, North Carolina in the 1950s.

References

People from Luzerne County, Pennsylvania
Benjamin Franklin University alumni
Military personnel from Pennsylvania
Mayors of Durham, North Carolina
North Carolina city council members
1919 births
2019 deaths
American accountants
American centenarians
Businesspeople from North Carolina
Men centenarians
North Carolina Democrats